John Hollis (12 November 1927 – 18 October 2005) was a British actor of TV and film. He is known for his uncredited appearance as Ernst Stavro Blofeld in the James Bond film For Your Eyes Only, as well as for his appearances in the Superman films, Casino Royale, The Dirty Dozen, Flash Gordon, and The Empire Strikes Back.

Early life
John Hollis was born Bertie Wyn Hollis in southwest London in 1927.

Career
He played the role of Lobot in The Empire Strikes Back and the German porter at the chateau in The Dirty Dozen. He appeared in the Christopher Reeve Superman films Superman and Superman II as an elder of Krypton, and in Superman IV: The Quest for Peace as a Russian General.

He also played the role of Ernst Stavro Blofeld in the cold open of the 1981 James Bond film For Your Eyes Only, going uncredited due to the controversy over the film rights and characters of Thunderball. In this sequence, his character was famously lifted from a wheelchair and dropped to his death down a chimney stack by Bond (Roger Moore) after he had attempted to kill Bond by using a remote control link to Bond's MI6 helicopter.

Hollis's other film work included minor roles in Captain Kronos – Vampire Hunter for Hammer Films and Gene Wilder's The Adventure of Sherlock Holmes' Smarter Brother. In television, Hollis took the role of Sondergaard in the Jon Pertwee era of Doctor Who in the story The Mutants, and appeared in The Avengers episode The Cybernauts as a sensei, and in The Superlative Seven as Magwitch. He was also in The Tomorrow People. He also appeared as "Kaufmann" with a young Julie Christie in the BBC classic 'lost series' A for Andromeda.

John Hollis was a versatile character actor for BBC Radio. Notable roles include Magwitch in Great Expectations, Leonard Bast in Howards End, Conan Doyle's Inspector Lestrade and Shakespeare's Bardolph. He also took part in some commercial recordings, in parts as various as the March Hare in Alice's Adventures in Wonderland and the Murderer of the Duke of Clarence in Richard III.

He broadcast his own recollections of a cockney childhood, for the BBC in the 1970s.

Selected filmography

Film

Television

References

External links

1927 births
2005 deaths
English male film actors
English male television actors
People from Fulham
Male actors from London
20th-century English male actors